London Corner is a suburb of Serekunda, the biggest city in the Gambia.

References 

Serekunda